is a Japanese football player who plays as a goalkeeper for FC Tokushima.

Career
He was educated at and played for Yosano Municipal Koyo Junior High School and Mineyama High School. He was selected as part of the squad to represent Japan U-18 in the AFC U-19 Championship.

After graduating from the high school in 2010, he joined the recent promoted J1 League side Cerezo Osaka. During his 3-year stay, he failed to make an appearance for the club. Hence he signed for Albirex Niigata Singapore from the S.League in 2013.

References

External links
 Contract with Kenjiro Ogino.
 Kenjiro Ogino renews contract.
 Player Profile on Albirex Niigata FC (S) Official Website.
 Official Facebook Page

1991 births
Living people
Association football people from Kyoto Prefecture
Japanese footballers
J1 League players
Japan Football League players
Singapore Premier League players
Cerezo Osaka players
Albirex Niigata Singapore FC players
MIO Biwako Shiga players
Association football goalkeepers
Expatriate footballers in Cambodia
Japanese expatriate sportspeople in Cambodia
Angkor Tiger FC players